|}

The Lady Wulfruna Stakes is a Listed flat horse race in Great Britain open to horses aged four years and over.
It is run at Wolverhampton over a distance of 7 furlongs and 36 yards, and it is scheduled to take place each year in March.

The race was first run in 2002 and was awarded Listed status in 2007.

The race is named after Wulfrun (Lady Wulfruna), the grand-daughter of King Ethelred I and Queen Aethelflaed.

Records

Most successful horse (2 wins):
 Border Music - 2006, 2007
 Dunelight - 2010, 2011

Leading jockey (4 wins):
 Ryan Moore - Dunelight (2010), Second Thought (2018), Urban Icon (2020), Mums Tipple (2021)

Leading trainer (3 wins):
 Andrew Balding – Border Music (2006, 2007), Berkshire Shadow (2023)

Winners

See also
 Horse racing in Great Britain
 List of British flat horse races

References

Racing Post:
, 

Flat races in Great Britain
Open mile category horse races
Wolverhampton Racecourse
Recurring sporting events established in 2002
2002 establishments in England